Three Nights in Tokyo is a live album by the Norwegian hard rock band TNT.

Track listing

Personnel

Band 
Tony Harnell – vocals
Ronni Le Tekrø – guitars
Morty Black – bass guitar
John Macaluso – drums, percussion

Additional personnel
Dag Stokke – keyboards

Sources
http://www.ronniletekro.com/discography-album-14.html

TNT (Norwegian band) albums
1992 live albums